Ikuma is a genus of Namibian palp-footed spiders that was first described by R. F. Lawrence in 1938.  it contains only two species, found only in Namibia: I. spiculosa and I. squamata.

See also
 List of Palpimanidae species

References

Endemic fauna of Namibia
Araneomorphae genera
Palpimanidae